Denis Yurievich Ten (13 June 1993 – 19 July 2018) was a Kazakhstani figure skater. He was the 2014 Olympic bronze medalist, a two-time World medalist (silver in 2013, bronze in 2015), the 2015 Four Continents champion, the 2017 Winter Universiade champion, and a five-time national champion of Kazakhstan.

Ten was the first skater from Kazakhstan to stand on the podium at the World Championships, Four Continents Championships, Asian Winter Games, and the Olympic Games. At the 2008–09 ISU Junior Grand Prix event in Belarus, he became the first skater from Kazakhstan to win an International Skating Union competition. His other accomplishments include qualifying two spots for his country in the men's event at the 2010 and 2014 Winter Olympics.

Ten was the official ambassador for the Olympic Bidding Committee "Almaty 2022". He was a member of the Astana Presidential Sports Club and the political party "Nur Otan", which ruled the country since 1991. In 2013, he began producing his own ice show, "Denis Ten and Friends". In summer 2014, he announced his cooperation with All That Sports management company established by Yuna Kim.

In July 2018, Ten was murdered in Almaty by two robbers who were attempting to steal his car mirrors.

Early life
Ten was born on 13 June 1993 in Almaty, Kazakhstan. He was a member of the Korean minority in Kazakhstan. His great-great-grandfather, Min Geung-ho, was a famous Korean independence fighter general during the time of the Korean Empire when Korea fought for independence from Japan.

Ten attended music school for five years and competed as part of a choir. In 2002, his team won the silver medal at the World Choir Games, held in Busan, South Korea. This was Ten's first trip to that country. He also tried taekwondo, karate, tennis, swimming and acrobatics.

Ten moved with his mother to Moscow, Russia, in 2004 while his father and older brother, Alexei, remained in Kazakhstan. Ten already spoke Russian—it is co-official in Kazakhstan and was Ten's first language. In 2010, he moved with his mother to the U.S. state of California.

Career

Early career
Ten began skating at an open-air rink in Almaty in winter and later practiced at an indoor rink in a shopping mall. In 2003, he traveled to Omsk in southwest Siberia, Russia, for a skating competition which he won. The head judge, Alexander Kogan, invited him to another competition in Odintsovo, Moscow region, where Ten met coach Elena Buianova (Vodorezova). Ten began training camp with her at CSKA Moscow and was later invited to join her group full-time.

2006–2007 season
Ten began competing internationally in the 2006–2007 season at the age of 13, which was the first year he was age-eligible for International Skating Union (ISU) junior-level competition. On 5 October 2006, he debuted on the ISU Junior Grand Prix (JGP) at the 2006–07 JGP event in The Hague, Netherlands. Ten placed 14th in the short program and 7th in the free skate to place 10th overall. In November, he competed at the 2006 Coupe Internationale de Nice in Nice, France, on the novice level. He won the event by 4.18 ahead of silver medalist Artur Gachinski.

In February 2007, Ten competed at the Dragon Trophy in Ljubljana, Slovenia. He won the junior men's event by 34.36 points over silver medalist Jason Thompson. Later that month, Ten competed at the 2007 World Junior Championships in Oberstdorf, Germany. He placed 26th in the short program and did not advance to the free skating portion of the event. He had placed 0.44 points below the final qualifier. Ten finished the season at the Haabersti Cup in Tallinn, Estonia, where he won the junior men's event by 16.34 points ahead of silver medalist Viktor Romanenkov.

2007–2008 season
Ten began his season on the 2007–08 JGP circuit. In September 2007, he competed at the JGP event in Miercurea Ciuc, Romania. He placed 3rd in the short program, 2.42 behind second-place finisher Ivan Bariev and 2.22 ahead of fourth-place finisher Andrew Lum. In the free skate, Ten placed 6th, and finished the event in 6th place overall, 5.09 points behind bronze medalist Takahito Mura. At Ten's second event two weeks later in Tallinn, he placed 10th in the short program and 10th in the free skate to place 10th overall. He finished the ISU Junior Grand Prix in 31st place to qualify for the Junior Grand Prix Final.

In November, Ten competed at the NRW Trophy on the junior level. He won both segments of the competition to win the gold medal by 22.59 points over silver medalist Gordei Gorshkov.

In February 2008, Ten competed at the 2008 World Junior Championships. He placed 8th in the short program, 3.36 points behind third-place finisher Brandon Mroz and 9.35 points behind first-place finisher Adam Rippon. In the short program, Ten was credited with a triple Lutz–triple toe loop combination and received a level 4 on his change foot combination spin. In the free skate, Ten placed 19th after falling twice, once on a triple Axel attempt, and the second time on his triple Lutz. However, he was credited with rotating the triple Axel. He placed 16th overall. Because of his placement at the World Junior Championships, Ten earned Kazakhstan the right to send one men's entry to every JGP event for the following season.

2008–2009 season

Ten began his season competing in the 2008–09 JGP. At his first event in Courchevel, France, he placed 5th in the short program and in the free skate to place 4th overall, placing 7.82 behind bronze medalist Florent Amodio. In his free skate, Ten landed a clean triple Axel. By placing 4th in his first event, Ten entered into contention to potentially qualify for the Junior Grand Prix Final. A month later, Ten competed at his second JGP event, the event in Gomel, Belarus. In the short program, Ten landed four triples, including a triple Axel, to win the short program by a 5.19 point margin of victory over second-place finisher Stanislav Kovalev. In the free skate, Ten landed six triple jumps to place 2nd in that segment of the competition by 3.88 points behind Yang Chao. Ten won the competition by 4.60 total points ahead of silver medalist Yang. By winning this competition, Ten simultaneously became the first skater from Kazakhstan to medal at an ISU competition and to win an ISU competition. Following the eighth and final Junior Grand Prix event, Ten became the first skater from Kazakhstan to qualify for the ISU Junior Grand Prix Final, for which he was the seventh qualifier.

Ten mentioned in interviews that he had landed the quad jump at the end of 2008, but an injury forced him to scale down training of the jump.

Ten competed at the 2008–09 JGP Final in Seoul, South Korea, in December 2008. In the short program, he landed a triple Axel, but fell on his combination jump and did not complete the combination to place 7th in that segment of the competition. In the free skating segment, Ten landed a triple Axel-double toe loop combination and six other triple jumps to place 3rd in that segment of the competition. He placed 5th overall, 0.31 points behind 4th-place finisher Ivan Bariev, and 3.59 points behind bronze medalist Richard Dornbush.

In February 2009, Ten made his senior international debut at the 2009 Four Continents in Vancouver, British Columbia, Canada, at the age of 15, the first year for which he was age-eligible for senior ISU championships. He placed 10th in the short program after landing a triple Axel and a triple Lutz, but missing his triple flip combination. He placed 8th in the free skate after landing six triples, including a triple Axel-triple toe loop combination, but popping a solo triple Axel and a triple flip. He placed 9th overall.

Two weeks later, Ten competed at the 2009 Junior Worlds. He placed 5th in the short program after being downgraded on the second jump in his triple-triple combination. In the free skate, Ten was credited with six triple jumps, including two triple Axels, and received another downgrade on the second jump of his triple-triple combination. He placed 4th in that segment of the competition, placing 0.32 points behind third-place finisher Artem Grigoriev in that segment of the competition. Ten placed 4th overall, ending the competition 0.63 points behind bronze medalist Grigoriev.

Ten finished the season at the 2009 World Championships, where he was the youngest male skater at the competition. He placed 17th in the short program after being credited with four triples, including his triple Axel and triple-triple combination. In the free skate, Ten was credited with eight triple jumps, the maximum number of triple jumps allowed, to place 6th in that segment of the competition. He placed 8th overall and qualified two spots for Kazakhstan at the Olympics for the first time in his sporting event's history.

2009–2010 season
Ten won the 2009 Golden Spin of Zagreb and placed fourth overall in the 2009 NRW Trophy. After he made his Senior debut in the 2009–10 Grand Prix series, where he was assigned to the 2009 Cup of China and the 2009 Skate Canada International. He placed tenth at the 2009 Cup of China with 182.63 points, and seventh at the 2009 Skate Canada scoring 193.33 overall.

At the 2010 Four Continents, he earned 70.50 points in the short program, where he placed fourth. He came in fourteenth position in the free skate scoring 102.15 after falling on two of his jumps. He finished tenth with a combined score of 172.65 points.

At the 2010 Winter Olympics, Ten received a score of 76.24 points in the short program, placing tenth. He was fourteenth in the free skate with 135.01 points to finish eleventh overall with a total score of 211.25.

At the 2010 World Championships, Ten was in ninth place after the short program and placed fifteenth in the free skate with a score of 125.06 points. He finished 13th with 202.46 points overall. Following the World Championship, he announced a coaching change to Frank Carroll and relocated with his mother to California. Ten also worked with Rafael Arutyunyan.

2010–2011 season
During the 2010–11 Grand Prix season, Ten competed at the 2010 NHK Trophy and the 2010 Skate America. At NHK, he placed 6th in the short program, but his long program saw him fall to 12th overall. At Skate America, he also placed sixth in the short program but dropped to 11th overall after the long program.

Ten won the gold medal at the 2011 Asian Winter Games with a first place in the short program and third in the long.

2011–2012 season
Ten was assigned to 2011 Skate America and 2011 Skate Canada International. He placed 5th in both events. At the 2012 Worlds in Nice, France, Ten finished 7th, his best result at a World Championships until this season.

2012–2013 season

Ten placed 6th at 2012 Skate Canada International, 9th at 2012 Rostelecom Cup and 12th at the 2013 Four Continents Championships. Later he explained that he had a series of injuries during the earlier part of the season, which prevented him from performing to his capacity.

At the 2013 World Championships, he scored a personal best of 91.56 points in the short program—second only to Patrick Chan—and received a small silver medal for the segment. Another personal best, 174.92 points, saw him place first in the long program and win a small gold medal. Overall, Ten won the silver medal with a total score of 266.48 points—just 1.3 points less than Chan. He became the first person from Kazakhstan to stand on a World podium in figure skating.

In June 2013, Carroll and Ten moved to the Toyota Sports Center in El Segundo, California.

2013–2014 season
Ten withdrew from his first 2013–14 Grand Prix assignment, the 2013 Skate America, due to an infection causing black spots on his ankles and an infection in his jaw. He competed at the 2013 Cup of China and placed fourth.

In February 2014, Ten competed at the 2014 Winter Olympics in Sochi. He placed ninth in the short program, third in the free skate, and won the bronze medal—it was the first ever Olympic medal for Kazakhstan in figure skating. He wore unmatched boots after having tried six pairs. Ten was named Breakthrough of the Year by the Agency of Sport and Physical Education of Kazakhstan and awarded a car by the mayor of Almaty. He did not participate in the 2014 World Championships.

During the summer, Ten's ice show Olympic Energy brought international skaters, including twelve Olympic medalists, to Kazakhstan, with the proceeds supporting the sport's development in the country and the treatment of a child with neuroleukemia.

2014–2015 season
For the 2014–15 season, Ten was assigned to the 2014 Skate America and 2014 Trophée Éric Bompard. At the Skate America event, he fell on the opening quadruple jumps in both the short program and the free skating, and earned fourth. At the Trophée Éric Bompard competition, he placed first in the short program, then won bronze after the free skating. In December, at the 2014 Golden Spin of Zagreb event, he won gold.

At the 2015 Four Continents Championships in Seoul, South Korea, Ten set personal best scores of 97.61 and 191.85 points in the short program and free skating, respectively. He placed first in both segments of the competition and won the title with total points of 289.46, the third highest score at an ISU championship at the time.

At the 2015 World Championships, Ten was in third place after the short program and first in the free skate. With a total of 267.72 points, he won the bronze medal.

2015–2016 season
Ten planned to start the season at the 2015 Skate Canada Autumn Classic, but had to withdraw due to an injury. With a lower back and hip injury, he placed 9th at the 2015 Skate America. At the 2015 Trophée Éric Bompard, he placed 4th at the short program segment of the competition, before the event was cancelled due to the November 2015 Paris Attacks.

Ten withdrew from the 2016 Four Continents Figure Skating Championships, again due to an injury. After that, he placed 2nd at the 2016 Coupe du Printemps competition with a new free skating program, Romeo and Juliet. At the competition, he attempted a quad salchow jump in his free skating. Ten finished 11th at the 2016 World Figure Skating Championships.

2016–2017 season
Ten withdrew from the 2016 Skate America. He won the silver medal at the 2016 Trophée de France. Ten won gold at the 2017 Winter Universiade in Almaty, after placing first in both the short and free programs. He placed tenth at the Asian Winter Games, and ended the season with a sixteenth-place finish at the World Championships. During this season, Ten mainly worked with Nikolai Morozov.

2017–2018 season
During the summer of 2017, Ten worked with Benoît Richaud and David Wilson to prepare for his Olympic season programs. While visiting South Korea for an ice show, Ten suffered a right ankle injury. He stayed in South Korea during the rehabilitation period for his ankle. However, he still competed in his Grand Prix events, first at the Rostelecom Cup placing 9th, and then at the Internationaux de France placing 8th. At the Four Continents Championships in late January, he placed 15th. Ten finished 27th at the 2018 Winter Olympics in Pyeongchang. This was his final Olympic appearance before his murder in July.

2018–2019 season
According to Lori Nichol, Ten had a plan to create his short program with her in Toronto at the end of July. He was going to reuse his free skating from the 2017–2018 season, after rearranging it in the updated ISU format (30 seconds shorter) with David Wilson. However, Ten's plans were vanished after his brutal murder in Kazakhstan.

Personal life
In May 2014, Ten graduated from the Kazakh Academy of Sports and Tourism with a Red Diploma. By 2015, he began working on his MBA program (Oil and Gas) at the Business School of the Kazakh-British Technical University.

In July 2015, the media reported on Ten's interest in photography. There is a separate social media page where he posted the photos he took. Celebrities who have modelled for or collaborated with him include Dinara Baktybayeva, Aissulu Azimbayeva, Aliya Telebarisova (Kazakhstani actresses), Sabina Altynbekova, and Serik Sapiyev.

Death
Ten was stabbed in the thigh on 19 July 2018 in Almaty by two carjackers who were attempting to steal his car mirrors, which were worth about  U.S. dollars.

The Kazakhstan Minister of Culture and Sport Arystanbek Muhamediuly paid tribute to Ten, saying "Denis Ten was an incredible figure skater, the legend of our sport, our pride." United States figure skaters Adam Rippon, Gracie Gold, Ashley Wagner, and Mirai Nagasu, who used to train with Ten, also paid tribute to him, along with several other international figure skaters including Patrick Chan, Tessa Virtue, Scott Moir, Alex Shibutani, Evgenia Medvedeva, Adelina Sotnikova, and many others. IOC president Thomas Bach stated, "Denis Ten was a great athlete and a great ambassador for his sport. A warm personality and a charming man. Such a tragedy to lose him at such a young age."

The two suspects—both male, one aged 23 and the other 24 years old—were apprehended the next day. In January 2019, they were sentenced to 18 years in a penal colony.

A civil funeral service for Ten took place on 21 July 2018 in Almaty. Ten's coffin was taken to the Baluan Sholak Sports Palace, where friends, family, and members of the public gathered to pay their respects. A mourning rally was also held at the Barys Arena in Astana.

Programs

Competitive highlights

GP: Grand Prix; CS: Challenger Series; JGP: Junior Grand Prix

Detailed results
Small medals for short programs and free skating awarded only at ISU Championships.

Legacy
On June 22, 2019, a memorial to Denis Ten was opened in Almaty. The two-meter bronze pedestal depicts one of the moments of the skater's final performance at the 2014 Olympic Games in Sochi.

References

External links

 

1993 births
2018 deaths
Kazakhstani male single skaters
Olympic figure skaters of Kazakhstan
Olympic bronze medalists for Kazakhstan
Olympic medalists in figure skating
Medalists at the 2014 Winter Olympics
Figure skaters at the 2010 Winter Olympics
Figure skaters at the 2014 Winter Olympics
Figure skaters at the 2018 Winter Olympics
Asian Games gold medalists for Kazakhstan
Asian Games medalists in figure skating
Medalists at the 2011 Asian Winter Games
Figure skaters at the 2011 Asian Winter Games
Figure skaters at the 2017 Asian Winter Games
Universiade medalists in figure skating
Astana Presidential Club
Sportspeople from Almaty
Kazakhstani people of Korean descent
Koryo-saram
Kazakhstani murder victims
People murdered in Kazakhstan
Deaths by stabbing in Kazakhstan
Male murder victims
Universiade gold medalists for Kazakhstan
Competitors at the 2017 Winter Universiade
2018 crimes in Kazakhstan
2010s murders in Kazakhstan
2018 murders in Asia
Four Continents Figure Skating Championships medalists
World Figure Skating Championships medalists
July 2018 events in Kazakhstan